

Gmina Kolonowskie, German Gemeinde Colonnowska is an urban-rural gmina (municipality) in Strzelce County, Opole Voivodeship, in Upper Silesia in Poland.

Since 2006, the township, like much of the area, has been officially bilingual in German and Polish.

Villages
The commune contains the villages of Kolonowskie, Spórok, Staniszcze Małe and Staniszcze Wielkie.

Neighbouring districts
Gmina Kolonowskie is bordered by the gminas of Dobrodzień, Jemielnica, Ozimek, Strzelce Opolskie and Zawadzkie.

Twin towns – sister cities

Gmina Kolonowskie is twinned with:

 Beilrode, Germany
 Bělotín, Czech Republic
 Chmelnica, Slovakia
 Gehrden, Germany
 Wolfsgraben, Austria

References

Kolonowskie
Bilingual communes in Poland